The Energy Security Act was signed into law by U.S. President Jimmy Carter on June 30, 1980.

It consisted of six major acts:
 U.S. Synthetic Fuels Corporation Act
 Biomass Energy and Alcohol Fuels Act
 Renewable Energy Resources Act
 Solar Energy and Energy Conservation Act
 Solar Energy and Energy Conservation Bank Act
 Geothermal Energy Act
 Ocean Thermal Energy Conversion Act

See also
Energy security
Energy Independence and Security Act of 2007

References

 DOE Timeline: 1971-1980, Department of Energy
President Carter and the Search for Synthetic Fossil Fuels

1980 in law
96th United States Congress
United States federal energy legislation
Energy security